The Šiauliai Biomass Power Plant  is a biomass combined heat and power plant in Šiauliai, Lithuania. It supplies heat to almost half of Šiauliai and creates 11 MW of electric energy.

Construction started in 2011 and finished in 2012. On 19 July 2012 Power Plant started to work.

References

Energy infrastructure completed in 2012
2012 establishments in Lithuania
Cogeneration power stations in Lithuania
Biofuel power stations in Lithuania
Buildings and structures in Šiauliai